The women's +78 kg competition at the 2018 European Judo Championships was held on 28 April at the Expo Tel Aviv.

Results

Final

Repechage

Top half

Bottom half

References

External links
 

W79
European Judo Championships Women's Heavyweight
European W79